Cephalota circumdata is a tiger beetle species in the genus Cephalota that can be found in such European countries as Albania, Bulgaria, France, Greece, Italy, North Macedonia, Romania, Spain, Ukraine, and on the islands such as Balearic, Sardinia, and Sicily. It can also be found in African nations of Algeria and Tunisia, and in Turkey.

References

Cicindelidae
Beetles described in 1822
Beetles of North Africa
Beetles of Asia
Beetles of Europe